ITF-6 is the implementation of an Interleaved 2 of 5 (ITF) barcode to encode a addon to ITF-14 and ITF-16 barcodes. Originally was developed as a part of JIS specification for Physical Distribution Center. Instead of ITF-14, it wasn’t standardized by ISO Committee but it is widely used to encode additional data to Global Trade Item Number such as items quantity or container weight.

History
In 1983, the Logistics Symbol Committee proposed the Interleaved 2 of 5 barcode as a method to improve the JAN code. In 1985, a logistics symbol JIS drafting committee was set up at the Distribution System Development Center, and the final examination was started toward JIS. Then in 1987 it was standardized as JIS-X-0502, a standard physical distribution barcode symbol ITF-14/16/6.

The ITF barcode has an add-on version for displaying the weight, etc., and it is possible to encode a 5-digits numerical value and 6-th check character as ITF-6  after ITF-14 or ITF-16(obsolete in 2010).

Currently ITF-6 isn’t standardized by ISO Committee and it is used only as a part of JIS standards. However, it is widely used by manufacturers to encode additional data and it is supported by wide range of barcode scanners

Uses
Despite the fact that ITF-6 barcode isn’t included into ISO standards, it is widely used as add-on to encode items quantity in package or item weight. At this time, it is used only with ITF-14 (Global Trade Item Number), but up to 2010 it was used with standardized only in Japan ITF-16 (Extended Symbology for Physical Distribution).

From the left, ITF-6 contains 5 significant digits and the last one is control digit, which is calculated same way as UPC checksums. If a decimal point is required, the decimal point is between the 3rd and 4th digits:
NNNNN(C/D) - without decimal point;
NNN.NN(C/D) - with decimal point.

ITF-6 is supported by various barcode generating software and barcode scanners.

Checksum
Checksum is calculated as other UPC checksums:

Example for the first 5 digits 12345:
10 - ((3*1 + 2 + 3*3 + 4 + 3*5) mod 10) = 7. Check digit is 7.

See also
 Automated identification and data capture (AIDC)
 Barcode
 Global Trade Item Number
 ITF-14
 Interleaved 2 of 5
 Japanese Industrial Standards

References

External links
 Free ITF-6 generator
 JISX0502:1994 (in Japanese)
 Standard Symbology for Physical Distribution

Automatic identification and data capture
Barcodes
Encodings